Baroque in Croatia (Barok u Hrvatskoj) is a 1942 documentary short directed by Oktavijan Miletić about the life of Janko Drašković. Music for the film was produced by Croatian composer Boris Papandopulo.

External links 
 
 Strastveni filmofil 

1942 films
Croatian-language films
Croatian short documentary films
1942 documentary films
Biographical documentary films
1940s short documentary films
Croatian black-and-white films